Lilium canadense, commonly called either the Canada lily, wild yellow-lily, or the meadow lily, is a native of eastern North America. Its native range extends from Ontario to Nova Scotia south to Georgia and Alabama. It is most common in New England, the Appalachian Mountains, and the Canadian Maritimes. It is also cultivated as an ornamental in Europe and other places.

Flowers emerge in June. They are nodding (hanging downward), yellow, orange or red, often with darker spots. The plant has become less common in urban and suburban areas due to heavy browsing by the white-tailed deer.

Description 
These plants usually live in moist meadows and wood margins. They can grow up to 0.5-1.5m with yellow, orange or red flowers 50–75 mm wide which emerge between June and July.

Culinary uses 
The flower buds and roots traditionally gathered and eaten by North American indigenous peoples.

Conservation status in the United States
It is listed Rare in Indiana, as Exploitably Vulnerable in New York (state), and as Threatened in Rhode Island and Tennessee.

References

External links
 
 
 
 
 Connecticut Botanical Society 

canadense
Flora of Canada
Flora of the Eastern United States
Plants described in 1753
Taxa named by Carl Linnaeus
Plants used in Native American cuisine